William Aiton (9 January 1760 – 8 July 1847) was a Scottish law agent, agriculturalist and sheriff-substitute of the county of Lanark. He was an authority on all matters bearing on Scottish husbandry.

He was born at Silverwood, Kilmarnock, in 1760, a neighbourhood which he left in 1785 to go to Strathaven, Lanarkshire, where he practised for many years as a law agent. He next went to Hamilton, where he held office as one of the sheriff-substitutes of the county from 1816 up to 1822. He died in 1847. At no period did his income exceed a hundred a year, and yet out of this, with a family of twelve children, he educated four sons for liberal professions, often sending them his last guinea when they were students at college.

Works
Aiton's works are:

A Treatise on Moss-earth, Ayr, 1811. 
General View of the Agriculture of the County of Ayr, Glasgow, 1811. 
General View of the Agriculture of the County of Bute, Glasgow, 1816. 
A History of the Rencounter at Drumclog and Battle at Bothwell Bridge, Hamilton, 1821. 
An Inquiry into the Pedigree of the Hamilton Family, Glasgow, 1827. 
Inquiry into the House of Aiton in Scotland, Hamilton, 1830.

References

Scottish lawyers
Scottish sheriffs
1760 births
1847 deaths
People from Kilmarnock
Scottish agriculturalists